Josip Milardović (born 10 January 1982) is a Croatian retired football midfielder.

Career
Milardović established himself as a fixture in the NK Osijek first team as a 20-year-old in the 2002–2003 season, becoming the team's captain in 2006. He was called up for a trial at Amkar Perm in January 2007, but the deal fell through as he still had six months left of his contract. After his contract expired he joined Međimurje for the 2007–2008 season, but left the club after it was relegated, joining Cibalia Vinkovci. After two seasons in the club, he left for another Prva HNL team, Slaven Belupo in the summer of 2010, signing a two-year contract.

References

External links

1982 births
Living people
People from Odžak
Association football midfielders
Croatian footballers
Croatia under-21 international footballers
NK Osijek players
NK Međimurje players
HNK Cibalia players
NK Slaven Belupo players
Guangdong Sunray Cave players
NK Inter Zaprešić players
Terengganu F.C. II players
Croatian Football League players
China League One players
Croatian expatriate footballers
Expatriate footballers in China
Croatian expatriate sportspeople in China
Expatriate footballers in Malaysia
Croatian expatriate sportspeople in Malaysia